Robert Poynaunt (fl. early 1400s) was the member of the Parliament of England for Salisbury for the parliaments of 1420 and May 1421. He was also mayor of Salisbury.

References 

Members of Parliament for Salisbury
English MPs 1420
Year of birth unknown
Year of death unknown
Mayors of Salisbury
Reeves (England)
English MPs May 1421